The Yukon Flats National Wildlife Refuge is a protected wetland area in the U.S. state of Alaska. It encompasses most of the Yukon Flats, a vast wetland area centered on the confluence of the Yukon River, Porcupine River, and Chandalar River.

The area is a major waterfowl breeding ground, and after a proposal to flood the Yukon Flats via a dam on the Yukon River was turned down, the Yukon Flats were deemed worthy of protection. 

On 1 December 1978, US President Jimmy Carter designated the Yukon Flats as a National Monument on the basis of the Antiquities Act of 1906. In the course of the Alaska National Interest Lands Conservation Act of December 2, 1980, the area boundaries were changed after political criticism and the status was downgraded to that of a wildlife refuge. It is the third-largest National Wildlife Refuge in the United States, although it is less than one-half the size of either of the two largest, the Arctic National Wildlife Refuge, or the Yukon Delta National Wildlife Refuge. The refuge is administered from offices in Fairbanks.

Fauna
This refuge is home to bird and mammalian species such as the Arctic fox, moose, bald eagle, black bear, wolf packs, porcupine, four species of falcon, river otter, golden eagle, red fox, Dall sheep, muskrat, coyote, six species of owl, Canadian lynx, beaver, caribou, mink, wolverine, and brown bear.

References

Further reading
Alaska Internet Travel Guide. "Alaska National Wildlife Refuges: Yukon Flats Wildlife Refuge", AlaskaOne.com. Accessed February 17, 2009.
U.S. Fish and Wildlife Service. "Yukon Flats National Wildlife Refuge", FWS.gov. Accessed February 17, 2009.
U.S. Forest Service. "Ecological Subregions of the United States: Section 139A--Upper Yukon Flats", Fs.fed.us. Accessed February 17, 2009.
U.S. Geological Survey. "Oil and Gas Assessment of Yukon Flats, East-Central Alaska, 2004", USGS.gov. December 14, 2004. Accessed February 17, 2009.
U.S. Geological Survey. "Yukon Flats National Wildlife Refuge", Geographic Names Information System. Accessed February 17, 2009.

External links

 
 
 A YouTube video showing and describing the Yukon Flats.

ANILCA establishments
Landforms of Yukon–Koyukuk Census Area, Alaska
National Wildlife Refuges in Alaska
Protected areas of Yukon–Koyukuk Census Area, Alaska
Wetlands of Alaska
Yukon River
Protected areas established in 1980
1980 establishments in Alaska